Vincenzo Russo (1770–1799) was an Italian revolutionary supportive of the Parthenopean Republic. The name may also refer to:
Vincenzo Russo (1901–1976), Italian lawyer and politician who served on the Chamber of Deputies from 1963 to 1968
Vincenzo Russo (1924–2005), Italian politician who was a member of the Chamber of Deputies from 1958 to 1992, then served on the Senate until 1994